Ashbel Welch (1809–1882) was a prominent American civil engineer and a president of the American Society of Civil Engineers (ASCE) in 1882.

Early life 
On December 4, 1809, Welch was born in 
Nelson, New York. Welch's father was Ashbel Welch, Sr. (1764-1826). Welch's mother was Margaret "Peggy" Dorrance Welch (1776-1830).
Welch had two elder brothers Sylvester Welch (1798-1852) and William Welch (1800-1839).

Education 
In 1843, he earned an honorary degree of Master of Arts from the College of New Jersey at Princeton, which was renamed to Princeton University in 1896.

Career 
In 1826, Welch started his engineering career as a rodman on the Lehigh and Delaware Canal for his brother Sylvester Welch.

In 1830, Welch joined engineers of Canvass White in Trenton, New Jersey on the construction of the Delaware and Raritan Canal. In 1832, Welch was in charge of digging the feeder northwestward from Trenton, New Jersey. Welch selected Lambertville for his headquarters. In 1834, the Delaware and Raritan Canal completed and it opened for business. 

In 1836, at age 26, Welch was appointed the chief engineer of the Joint Companies (Delaware and Raritan Canal Company & Camden and Amboy Railroad & Transportation Company).

In 1836, Welch was appointed Chief Engineer of the Philadelphia and Trenton Railroad.

In 1844, Welch traveled to England and supervised the construction of an order of guns for the United States Navy.

In 1863, Welch led the efforts on installation of a block signaling system on the Camden and Amboy Railroad between Philadelphia and New Brunswick. First in America, The signaling system was a first installation of in America, which later  used on all American railroads.

In 1869, Welch became President of the Bel-Del Railroad and the Flemington Railroad.

In 1872, Welch resigned as President of United Companies. Welch became the superintendent of Bel-Del Railroad under Pennsylvania Railroad (PRR) management. Welch maintained his duties as a chief engineer.

Personal life 
On October 25, 1834, Welch married Mary Hannah Seabrook (1813-1874) in Lambertville, New Jersey. Her parents were James and Merriam Lambert Seabrook. They had seven children.

On September 25, 1882, Welch died in his home on 21 York St, Lambertville, New Jersey. Welch is buried at Mount Hope Cemetery, Lambertville, Hunterdon County, New Jersey, USA.

See also 
 Pennsylvania Railroad
 William H. Rau - photographer who documented scenic views of Pennsylvania RR.

References

Further reading 
Snell, J. P. (1881). History of Hunterdon and Somerset counties, New Jersey: with illustrations and biographical sketches of its prominent men and pioneers. Philadelphia: Everts & Peck.

External links 
 Lambertville Historical Society
 Lambertville  Transportation Chronology
 Wind Pressure Against Bridges by Ashbel Welch at ASCE.org
 Ashbel Welch at Grace's Guide
 Manual Block in the United States

1809 births
1882 deaths
American engineers